1931 Országos Bajnokság I (men's water polo) was the 25th water polo championship in Hungary. There were nine teams who played  match for the title.

Final list 

* M: Matches W: Win D: Drawn L: Lost G+: Goals earned G-: Goals got P: Point

See also 
History of water polo

Sources 
Gyarmati Dezső: Aranykor (Hérodotosz Könyvkiadó és Értékesítő Bt., Budapest, 2002.)
Magyar Sport Almanach 1931-1934

1931 in water polo
1931 in Hungarian sport
Seasons in Hungarian water polo competitions